Riley S. Young (September 25, 1860June 28, 1952) was an American pharmacist, banker, and Republican politician.  He was the 47th speaker of the Wisconsin State Assembly (1919–1923) and represented Walworth County.

Biography
He was born in Sharon, Wisconsin. He graduated from high school in Delavan, Wisconsin in 1879. On April 11, 1888, he married Elizabeth Williams. Young eventually worked for the Hartford Fire Insurance Company.

Young died at the age of 91.

Political career
Young was first elected to the Assembly in 1916. He would later be chosen as Speaker for the 1919 and 1921 sessions. Previously, he had been Town Clerk of Darien (town), Wisconsin from 1887 to 1894. Young was a Republican.

References

External links
 

People from Sharon, Wisconsin
Republican Party members of the Wisconsin State Assembly
City and town clerks
1860 births
1952 deaths
People from Darien, Wisconsin